Tanner Hill is a summit located in Central New York Region of New York located in the Town of Newport in Herkimer County, west-northwest of Middleville. Beech Hill is located south-southwest of Tanner Hill.

References

Mountains of Herkimer County, New York
Mountains of New York (state)